Great Bridge High School is a public secondary school in Chesapeake, Virginia, United States. It is part of Chesapeake City Public Schools.

History
Great Bridge opened in 1907, holding students from 1st through 12th grade. Another larger building opened in 1924, which also housed students from 1st through 11th grade. In 1954, Great Bridge moved to another new larger building which accommodated students in 6th through 12th grade. This building has now become the site of Great Bridge Middle School. In 1983, the current site of Great Bridge opened, which accommodates students in the 9th through 12th grade.

Athletics
The mascot is a wildcat and the sports teams currently play in the AAA Southeastern District of the AAA Eastern Region. The women's field hockey team won the state title in 2016, 2017, and 2018.

Theatre
In 2002, the Great Bridge High School Theatre Company placed first at the Virginia Theatre Association One-Act Competition, performing Gilgamesh: Man's First Story. The GBHS Theatre Company won again in 2005, performing The Standard of the Man.

Notable alumni

Ken Barefoot, NFL Football Player, Washington Redskins 1968, 1969 
Michael Cuddyer, New York Mets player; ninth overall pick in the 1997 MLB Draft by the Minnesota Twins
Mark Davis, 9th pick of the fourth round of the 1985 NBA Draft by the Cleveland Cavaliers 
Dave Elkins, member of the band Mae, on vocals and guitar
Randy Forbes, U.S. Congressman
Larry Griffin, NFL football player, Pittsburgh Steelers, Houston Oilers.  Class of 1981 
George L. Hanbury II, President/CEO, Nova Southeastern University
Quanitra Hollingsworth, WNBA Minnesota Lynx 9th overall pick 2009 
Lawrence Johnson, 2000 Olympics pole vault silver medalist; 2001 World Indoor pole vault champion
Connor Jones, second round pick in the 2016 MLB Draft by the St. Louis Cardinals
Jim Kitts, NFL football player, Miami Dolphins, Washington Redskins, Green Bay Packers. '90 
Nate Parker, actor; wrestler 
Carlton Powell, Denver Broncos' fifth round pick in 2008 NFL Draft
Chris Rahl, All-American college baseball player at William & Mary 
Chris Richardson, American Idol season six finalist
Justin Upton, Los Angeles Angels player; top pick in the 2005 MLB Draft by the Arizona Diamondbacks
B.J. Upton, born Melvin Emanuel Upton Jr., Major League Baseball player
 Brianté Weber (born 1992), basketball player in the Israeli Basketball Premier League
Caine Wilkes, weightlifter

External links
Official website

References

Educational institutions established in 1907
Public high schools in Virginia
Schools in Chesapeake, Virginia
1907 establishments in Virginia